Nineteen or  19 may refer to:
 19 (number), the natural number following 18 and preceding 20
 one of the years 19 BC, AD 19, 1919, 2019

Films 
 19 (film), a 2001 Japanese film
 Nineteen (film), a 1987 science fiction film

Music 
 19 (band),  a Japanese pop music duo

Albums 
 19 (Adele album), 2008
 19, a 2003 album by Alsou
 19, a 2006 album by Evan Yo
 19, a 2018 album by MHD
 19, one half of the double album 63/19 by Kool A.D.
 Number Nineteen, a 1971 album by American jazz pianist Mal Waldron
 XIX (EP), a 2019 EP by 1the9

Songs 
 "19" (song), a 1985 song by British musician Paul Hardcastle.
 "Nineteen", a song by Bad4Good from the 1992 album Refugee
 "Nineteen", a song by Karma to Burn from the 2001 album Almost Heathen.
 "Nineteen" (song), a 2007 song by American singer Billy Ray Cyrus.
 "Nineteen", a song by Tegan and Sara from the 2007 album The Con.
 "XIX" (song), a 2014 song by Slipknot.
 19, a song by Pencey Prep from the 2001 album Heartbreak in Stereo.

Places

See also 
 COVID-19, an infectious disease
 Mecklenburg XIX, a class of German steam locomotives
 Renault 19, a French automobile
 List of highways numbered 19